Phrynopus pesantesi is a species of frog in the family Strabomantidae.
It is endemic to Peru.
Its natural habitat is subtropical or tropical high-altitude grassland.

References

pesantesi
Amphibians of the Andes
Amphibians of Peru
Endemic fauna of Peru
Taxonomy articles created by Polbot
Amphibians described in 2005